Roger Labon Jackson is an American voice actor. He is known for voicing Ghostface in the Scream film series, where E! ranked him as #46 on their list of Best Kept Secrets of Hollywood. He is also known for voicing the character of Mojo Jojo on The Powerpuff Girls.

Career
Jackson is known for providing the voice for the serial killer Ghostface in the Scream film franchise. He has also appeared in animated films and television series such as The Walt Disney Company's The Book of Pooh. Jackson also voiced the primate supervillain Mojo Jojo and the Rowdyruff Boy Butch on the Cartoon Network animated series The Powerpuff Girls. His Mojo Jojo voice is later featured in The Powerpuff Girls Movie and Cartoon Network's FusionFall online video game.

Jackson has also played an active role in the video game industry; voicing heroes for Galleon and Baldur's Gate, robots in Thrillville: Off the Rails and working for several Star Wars and Star Trek titles. On top of that, he provides voices for all the original cats on the Catz virtual pet program. He has contributed to Final Fantasy X and King's Quest VII and has done educational programs for both The Learning Company and Broderbund. For American McGee's Alice and its sequel, Alice: Madness Returns, he has also provided the voices for the Cheshire Cat, the Mad Hatter, the Dormouse and the Jabberwock. He played the tyrant Colonel Nohman from Zone of the Enders and Zone of the Enders: The 2nd Runner. He also voiced John O'Conner in Delphine Software International's Fade to Black.

Jackson voiced Mr. Mucus in Mucinex ads for ten years, originating the rough New Yorker characterization in 2004.

On October 10, 2017, Keke Palmer confirmed in an interview that Jackson, who voiced Ghostface in the film series, would reprise the role for the third season of the slasher television series Scream, replacing Mike Vaughn, who served as the voice for two characters, the Lakewood Slasher in the first two seasons and the Shallow Grove Slasher in the Halloween special episodes following the second season. The season premiered on VH1 on July 8, 2019.

Jackson reprised his voice role as Ghostface in the fifth Scream film, which was directed by Matt Bettinelli-Olpin and Tyler Gillett. The film was released on January 14, 2022. He later returned to voice Ghostface in Scream VI, which released on March 10, 2023.

Filmography

Film

Television

Video games

Live-action

References

External links
 
 

20th-century American male actors
21st-century American male actors
American male video game actors
American male voice actors
Audiobook narrators
Living people
Year of birth missing (living people)